is a Fukui Railway Fukubu Line railway station located in the city of  Sabae, Fukui Prefecture, Japan.

Lines

Station layout
The station consists of one ground-level island platform connected to the station building by a level crossing. The station is unattended.

Adjacent stations

History
The station opened on October 5, 1927. Upon the closure of the Seiko Line win 1970, the transfer platform was demolished. A Free park-and-ride lot for 80 cars opened on October 1, 2004.

Passenger statistics
In fiscal 2015, the station was used by an average of 161 passengers daily (boarding passengers only).

Surrounding area
Sabae Post Office
Sabae Municipal Library
Sabae Welfare Center
Pacific War Memorial

See also
 List of railway stations in Japan

References

External links

  

Railway stations in Fukui Prefecture
Railway stations in Japan opened in 1927
Fukui Railway Fukubu Line
Sabae, Fukui